Cochise is an unincorporated community located in Cochise County, Arizona, United States.  The city was created alongside the Southern Pacific Railroad in the 1880s.  The city was primarily a stop for coal and water which were needed for trains at the time.  At its peak, the town had a population of approximately 3,000 people.  Today, only 50 people still live in Cochise.  The town is also home to several historic locations. In 1899, Big Nose Kate, the famed sidekick of Doc Holliday, lived in Cochise while she was working at the Cochise Hotel after Holliday's death.

Cochise has the ZIP Code of 85606; in 2000, the population of the 85606 ZCTA was 1,592.

Climate
According to the Köppen Climate Classification system, Cochise has a semi-arid climate, abbreviated "BSk" on climate maps.

Photo gallery

See also

 Willcox Playa
 Cochise Train Robbery

References

External links
 
 

Unincorporated communities in Cochise County, Arizona
Unincorporated communities in Arizona
Ghost towns in Arizona
Cemeteries in Arizona